There are at least 48 members of the poplar and willow order, Salicales, found in Montana.  Some of these species are exotics (not native to Montana) and some species have been designated as Species of Concern.

Family: Salicaceae

Populus × acuminata, lanceleaf cottonwood, 
Populus alba, white poplar
Populus angustifolia, narrowleaf cottonwood
Populus balsamifera, black cottonwood
Populus × brayshawii, hybrid balsam poplar
Populus deltoides, eastern cottonwood
Populus tremuloides, quaking aspen
Salix alba, white willow
Salix amygdaloides, peach-leaf willow
Salix arctica, arctic willow
Salix barclayi, Barclay's willow
Salix barrattiana, Barratt's willow
Salix bebbiana, Bebb's willow
Salix boothii, Booth's willow
Salix brachycarpa, short-fruit willow
Salix candida, hoary willow
Salix cascadensis, Cascade willow
Salix commutata, undergreen willow
Salix discolor, pussy willow
Salix drummondiana, Drummond's willow
Salix eastwoodiae, Eastwood's willow
Salix eriocephala, diamond willow
Salix eriocephala var. famelica, Missouri River willow
Salix eriocephala var. mackenzieana, Mackenzie's willow
Salix eriocephala var. watsonii, yellow willow
Salix exigua, sandbar willow
Salix farriae, Farr's willow
Salix × fragilis, crack willow
Salix geyeriana, Geyer's willow
Salix glauca, gray willow
Salix lasiandra, Pacific willow
Salix lasiandra var. caudata, greenleaf willow
Salix lasiandra var. lasiandra, Pacific willow
Salix lemmonii, Lemmon's willow
Salix melanopsis, dusky willow
Salix pentandra, laurel willow
Salix petiolaris, meadow willow
Salix planifolia, tea-leaved willow
Salix pseudomonticola, false mountain willow
Salix reticulata, net-veined willow
Salix rotundifolia, roundleaf willow
Salix × rubens, hybrid crack willow
Salix scouleriana, Scouler's willow
Salix serissima, autumn willow
Salix sitchensis, Sitka willow
Salix tweedyi, Tweedy's willow
Salix vestita, rock willow
Salix wolfii, Wolf willow

See also
 List of dicotyledons of Montana

Notes

Montana
Montana